19-Norandrostenediol may refer to:

 Bolandiol (19-nor-4-androstenediol)
 19-Nor-5-androstenediol

See also
 19-Norandrostenedione
 Androstenediol
 Androstenedione